A Girl of the People (German: Ein Mädel aus dem Volke) is a 1927 German silent historical drama film directed by Jacob Fleck and Luise Fleck and starring Xenia Desni, Harry Liedtke and Livio Pavanelli.

The film's sets were designed by the art director Botho Hoefer and August Rinaldi.

Cast
 Xenia Desni as Stasia Schopfinger, Tochter 
 Harry Liedtke as Kronprinz / Kaiser Josef II 
 Livio Pavanelli as Schnurl Schramseis, des Kaisers Bereiter 
 Hermann Picha as Schopfinger, Schuhmachermeister 
 Margarete Lanner as Gräfin Szathiany 
 Erich Kaiser-Titz as Fürst Kaunitz, Kanzler 
 Eduard von Winterstein as Generalissimus Laudon
 Julia Serda as Kaiserin Maria Theresia
 Karl Elzer as Kurfürst Max von Bayern
 Carla Bartheel as Prinzessin Maria Josepha
 Adolphe Engers as Leibarzt Quarin 
 Fritz Kampers as Der Geselle 
 Hans Brausewetter as Schusterjunge

References

Bibliography
 Bock, Hans-Michael & Bergfelder, Tim. The Concise CineGraph. Encyclopedia of German Cinema. Berghahn Books, 2009.

External links

1927 films
Films of the Weimar Republic
German silent feature films
German black-and-white films
1920s historical drama films
German historical drama films
Films set in the 18th century
Films directed by Jacob Fleck
Films directed by Luise Fleck
1927 drama films
Silent historical drama films
1920s German films
1920s German-language films